Edible ink printing is the process of creating preprinted images with edible food colors onto various confectionery products such as cookies, cakes and pastries. Designs made with edible ink can be either preprinted or created with an edible ink printer, a specialty device which transfers an image onto a thin, edible paper. 

Edible paper is made of starches and sugars and printed with edible food colors. Some edible inks and paper materials have been approved by the Food and Drug Administration and carry its generally recognized as safe certification.

Paper
The first papers of this process used rice paper, while modern versions use frosting sheets. The first U.S. patent for food printing, as it applied to edible ink printing, was filed by George J. Krubert of the Keebler Company and granted in 1981. Such paper is eaten without harmful effects. Most edible paper has no significant flavor and limited texture. Edible paper may be printed on by a standard printer and, upon application to a moist surface, dissolves while maintaining a high resolution. The end effect is that the image (usually a photograph) on the paper appears to be printed on the icing.

Edible inks
Edible printer inks have become prevalent and are used in conjunction with special ink printers. Ink that is not specifically marketed as being edible may be harmful or fatal if swallowed. Edible toner for laser printers is not currently available. Any inkjet or bubblejet printer can be used to print, although resolution may be poor, and care should be taken to avoid contaminating the edible inks with previously used inks. Inkjet or bubblejet printers can be converted to print using edible ink, and cartridges of edible ink are commercially available. It is always much safer to use a dedicated inkjet printer for edible ink printing.

Some edible inks are powdered, but if they are easily soluble in water they can also be used as any other edible ink without reducing quality. Edible paper is used on cakes, cookies, cupcakes and marshmallows.

References

External links
 
 Wafer paper compared tp icing sheets

Confectionery
Food and drink decorations
Food ingredients
Paper
Printing